Porirua Central is the central business district and central suburb of Porirua, in the Wellington region of New Zealand's North Island.

Demographics

Porirua Central had a population of 261 at the 2018 New Zealand census, a decrease of 174 people (-40.0%) since the 2013 census, and a decrease of 105 people (-28.7%) since the 2006 census. There were 33 households. There were 183 males and 78 females, giving a sex ratio of 2.35 males per female. The median age was 40.1 years (compared with 37.4 years nationally), with 12 people (4.6%) aged under 15 years, 69 (26.4%) aged 15 to 29, 165 (63.2%) aged 30 to 64, and 21 (8.0%) aged 65 or older.

Ethnicities were 57.5% European/Pākehā, 28.7% Māori, 13.8% Pacific peoples, 11.5% Asian, and 4.6% other ethnicities (totals add to more than 100% since people could identify with multiple ethnicities).

The proportion of people born overseas was 24.1%, compared with 27.1% nationally.

Although some people objected to giving their religion, 47.1% had no religion, 36.8% were Christian, 3.4% were Hindu, 2.3% were Muslim, 1.1% were Buddhist and 2.3% had other religions.

Of those at least 15 years old, 27 (10.8%) people had a bachelor or higher degree, and 81 (32.5%) people had no formal qualifications. The median income was $12,900, compared with $31,800 nationally. The employment status of those at least 15 was that 84 (33.7%) people were employed full-time, 42 (16.9%) were part-time, and 3 (1.2%) were unemployed.

Economy

Retail

North City Shopping Centre opened in Porirua Central in 1990. It has an area of 8,100 m2, 1100 carparks, and 102 stores, including Farmers, Kmart and Reading Cinemas.

References

Suburbs of Porirua
Central business districts in New Zealand